Peritoneal carcinomatosis (PC) is intraperitoneal dissemination (carcinosis) of any form of cancer that does not originate from the peritoneum itself. PC is most commonly seen in abdominopelvic malignancies. Computed tomography (CT) is particularly important for detailed preoperative assessment and evaluation of the radiological Peritoneal Cancer Index (PCI).

References

Further reading
 
 
 
 
 

Oncology